Ross Cullum (born 1957 in Fulham, London, England) is an English composer, record producer, songwriter, mixer, A&R and music industry consultant.

Career
Cullum became an assistant at George Martin's AIR Studios, where he worked on recordings by Roxy Music, Kate Bush, Karlheinz Stockhausen, Jeff Beck and others.

He has also worked alongside Geoff Emerick, Steve Nye, Bill Price, Jon Kelly, Peter Henderson, Bob Ezrin, Leiber and Stoller and Chris Thomas.

In the 1980s, after touring the world mixing live shows, he formed a production collaboration with Chris Hughes. Together they worked with Adam and the Ants, Tears for Fears, Wang Chung, Paul McCartney, Ric Ocasek and others.
 
Other artists he has worked with in varying capacities include Tori Amos, Miguel Bosé, Moya Brennan, Enya, Howard Jones, the Human League, the Afro Celt Sound System, Chris Hughes (Shift - a tribute to Steve Reich), Peter Gabriel, Sa Ding Ding, Robert Plant, Perry Blake, Mary-Jess Leaverland, Jana Kirschner, Andrew Lloyd Webber, Rufus Wainwright, Mark Ronson, Karen Mok, Zucchero, Don Was, and Phildel.

A founder of the RiverMediaGroup with studios in Battersea, he has also recently composed several film scores, utilising orchestral and hybrid electronic elements.

Cullum continues to produce, compose, record and mix. He also currently acts as a consultant in Music Production and A&R, travelling internationally.

References

1957 births
Living people
People from Fulham
English record producers
English songwriters
English male film score composers
Musicians from London
British male songwriters